Scrobipalpa paradoxa is a moth in the family Gelechiidae. It was described by Piskunov in 1990. It is found in China (Xinjiang), south-eastern Kazakhstan and Uzbekistan, where it was described from the Kyzylkum Desert in the Burkhara District.

References

Scrobipalpa
Moths described in 1990